Otayf is a surname. Notable people with the surname include:

Abdullah Otayf (born 1992), Saudi Arabian footballer 
Ali Otayf (born 1988), Saudi Arabian footballer

Arabic-language surnames